Patrick Osborne is an American  animator, screenwriter and film director. He won the Academy Award for Best Animated Short Film for his 2014 film Feast.

Early life and education
Osborne grew up in the Cincinnati suburb of Green Township, went to the Our Lady of the Visitation School for grade school, and graduated from St. Xavier High School in Cincinnati in 1999. He earned a degree in computer animation from the Ringling College of Art and Design in 2003.

Career
Osborne's directorial debut was the short film Feast (2014), about a Boston Terrier who loves getting fed junk food. The short was produced by Walt Disney Animation Studios and premiered in front of Big Hero 6 (2014) in theaters. It won the Academy Award for Best Animated Short Film in 2015. Osborne had previously worked as an animator on films such as Wreck-It Ralph (2012) and Bolt (2008).

He directed Pearl for Google's Spotlight Stories, a short film about the relationship between a father and his daughter. The film is set entirely in a car and shows the decay of the car and the structure of the film reflects the song which plays throughout it. It uses cuts, which were previously unexplored, and over forty sets, which is more than any other of the Google Spotlight shorts. For his work on the film, Osborne was again nominated for the Academy Award for Best Animated Short Film in 2017.

Osborne served as animation director for the ABC comedy series Imaginary Mary (which he co-created alongside The Goldbergs creator Adam F. Goldberg) until it was cancelled in 2017. He is directing Paul Popue's graphic novel Battling Boy.

Osborne has been selected by Paramount Pictures and Weed Road to direct a film version of the video game Monument Valley, originally developed by Ustwo in 2015.

In July 2022, it was announced that Osborne would direct an adaption of The Goon for Netflix.

Filmography
Feast (2014) – writer, director (short film)
Pearl (2016) – writer, director (short film)
Imaginary Mary (2017) – co-creator, executive producer, animation director (TV series)
Drawn Closer (2021) – co-writer, director (short film)
Happier Than Ever: A Love Letter to Los Angeles (2021) – co-director (featurette, concert film with animated sequences)

References

External links

American animators
American animated film directors
American animated film producers
Annie Award winners
Directors of Best Animated Short Academy Award winners
Living people
Year of birth missing (living people)
Walt Disney Animation Studios people
St. Xavier High School (Ohio) alumni
Ringling College of Art and Design alumni